Fairplay Township may refer to the following townships in the United States:

 Fairplay Township, Greene County, Indiana
 Fairplay Township, Marion County, Kansas